Sacrifice is a professional wrestling event held by Impact Wrestling. It was originally held as a pay-per-view event by the company under its previous name Total Nonstop Action Wrestling (TNA) between 2005 and 2014. The first Sacrifice event took place in August 2005. When event names were shuffled by TNA for 2006, the event was moved to May. Sacrifice has had a tradition of being the final round of tournaments. Sacrifice 2005 saw Samoa Joe defeat A.J. Styles to win the Super X Cup. Sacrifice 2006 was the final round of the World X Cup Tournament. Sacrifice 2008 continued the tradition with the finals of the Deuces Wild Tag Team Tournament. Sacrifice 2009 featured Beer Money, Inc. defeating The British Invasion in the finals of the Team 3D Invitational Tag Team Tournament. All events take place inside the Impact! Zone. On January 11, 2013, TNA announced that in 2013 will be only four PPVs, dropping Sacrifice. In 2016, Sacrifice was held as a special edition of Impact Wrestling and the promotion revived it as a monthly special for Impact Plus in 2020.

Events

References

External links
 TNAwrestling.com TNA Wrestling Official Website
 TNASacrifice.com TNA Sacrifice Mini Site
 Results at Pro Wrestling History